Sint-Barbaracollege in Ghent, Belgium, is a private Jesuit school, founded in 1833. It currently includes primary and secondary education.

History 
The school is built on the location of a cloister, the "Sint Barbaraklooster in Jerusalem". The cloister was founded in 1420 for Augustinian nuns, closed in 1783 by order of Joseph II, briefly reopened but closed again during the French Revolutionary War. In 1814 the building near the Ketelvest housed a secondary school, but that was closed in 1819 by order of William I who had opened an atheneum in the nearby buildings of the old Baudelo Abbey. In 1833, after the Belgian Revolution of 1830 the Bishop of Ghent, Jan Frans Van De Velde, gave the school to the Jesuits. The first students graduated in 1836. A school church was inaugurated on 6 November 1858.

Maurice Maeterlinck, who was sent there in 1874 (then aged 14) disliked the fact that in Sainte-Barbe works of the French Romantics were scorned and only plays on religious subjects were permitted. His experiences at this school influenced his distaste for the Catholic Church and organized religion.

Program 
Though located in a Dutch-speaking Flemish city, the language of instruction at Sint-Barbaracollege was French, and as such it was considered in the 19th and early 20th Century as instilling a French cultural identity in its young Flemish pupils – though some of them later rebelled against this identity, such as Joris Van Severen.

As of 2011, the Sint-Barbaracollege consists of K through 12: primary secondary education. Improvements since 2014 made way for a spacious new sports hall. In 2017 the school extended its Wi-Fi capability and increased the number of tablets available to students. There is an active parents' group which raises money for school improvements. The school persists in striving to implement and update the principles of Jesuit pedagogy in dialogue with Christian values as it addresses the challenges of a secularized and globalized society.

Notable alumni
      
 Karel Justinus Calewaert 
 Corneille Heymans
 Charles van Lerberghe
 Maurice Maeterlinck
 Gerard Mortier
 Albert Nyssens (1855-1901)
 Georges Rodenbach
    
 Jacques Rogge, IOC president
 François van Rysselberghe, scientist (1846-1893)
 Marcel Storme
 Joris van Severen
 Emile Verhaeren
 Philippe Herreweghe
 René Jacobs

See also
 List of Jesuit sites in Belgium
 Diocese of Ghent

References

1833 establishments in Belgium
Educational institutions established in 1833
Education in Ghent
Jesuit secondary schools in Belgium